The Emperor's Waltz is a 1933 German musical film directed by Frederic Zelnik and starring Mártha Eggerth, Paul Hörbiger, and Carl Esmond. It was shot at the Tempelhof Studios in Berlin with sets designed by the art director Franz Schroedter. Location shooting took place around the Austrian spa town Bad Ischl.

Plot 
In the days of Austro-Hungarian Emperor Franz Josef, an aristocrat and his son both fall for the same woman.

Distribution 
Distributed by Aafa-Film, the film was released in German cinemas on 24 January 1933 with the censorship visa granted on 21 December 1932. In Austria, the film was released in 1933 by Koppelmann & Reiter under the title Audienz in Ischl. General Foreign Sales Corp. oversaw its release in the United States.

Partial cast
Mártha Eggerth as Mizzi Schlaghofer, mistress of Olgahof
Paul Hörbiger as Count Eggersdorf
Carl Esmond as Viktor Eggersdorf
Fritz Kampers as Dr. Scharfinger
Hansi Niese as Stasi, head maid
S. Z. Sakall as Leitner - manufacturer from Budapest
Trude Berliner as Annemarie Schulz from Berlin
Olly Gebauer as Lori Stübinger - Soubrette
Arthur Bergen
Rupert Fischer
Fritz Spira
Helmut Krauss
Ernst Pröckl
Josef Reithofer
Wera Schultz
Rudolf Weinmann
Betty Bird

References

Bibliography 
 Klaus, Ulrich J. Deutsche Tonfilme: Jahrgang 1933. Klaus-Archiv, 1988.

External links

1933 musical films
Films of the Weimar Republic
German musical films
Films directed by Frederic Zelnik
Films scored by Nico Dostal
German black-and-white films
1930s German films
Films shot at Tempelhof Studios
Films shot in Austria